Trachycephalus venezolanus is a species of frog in the family Hylidae.
It is found in Brazil, Colombia, and Venezuela.
Its natural habitats are subtropical or tropical moist lowland forests, subtropical or tropical swamps, intermittent freshwater lakes, and freshwater marshes.
It is threatened by habitat loss.

References

Trachycephalus
Amphibians of Brazil
Amphibians of Colombia
Amphibians of Venezuela
Taxa named by Robert Mertens
Amphibians described in 1950
Taxonomy articles created by Polbot